The stretched exponential function  is obtained by inserting a fractional power law into the exponential function.
In most applications, it is meaningful only for arguments  between 0 and +∞. With , the usual exponential function is recovered. With a stretching exponent β between 0 and 1, the graph of log f versus t is characteristically stretched, hence the name of the function.

In mathematics, the stretched exponential is also known as the complementary cumulative Weibull distribution. The stretched exponential is also the characteristic function, basically the Fourier transform, of the Lévy symmetric alpha-stable distribution.

In physics, the stretched exponential function is often used as a phenomenological description of relaxation in disordered systems. It was first introduced by Rudolf Kohlrausch in 1854 to describe the discharge of a capacitor; thus it is also known as the Kohlrausch function. In 1970, G. Williams and D.C. Watts used the Fourier transform of the stretched exponential to describe dielectric spectra of polymers; in this context, the stretched exponential or its Fourier transform are also called the Kohlrausch–Williams–Watts (KWW) function.

In phenomenological applications, it is often not clear whether the stretched exponential function should be used to describe the differential or the integral distribution function—or neither. 
In each case, one gets the same asymptotic decay, but a different power law prefactor, which makes fits more ambiguous than for simple exponentials. In a few cases, it can be shown that the asymptotic decay is a stretched exponential, but the prefactor is usually an unrelated power.

Mathematical properties

Moments 

Following the usual physical interpretation, we interpret the function argument t as time, and fβ(t) is the differential distribution. The area under the curve 
can thus be interpreted as a mean relaxation time. One finds

where  is the gamma function. For exponential decay,  is recovered.

The higher moments of the stretched exponential function are

Distribution function

In physics, attempts have been made to explain stretched exponential behaviour as a linear superposition of simple exponential decays. This requires a nontrivial distribution of relaxation times, ρ(u), which is implicitly defined by 

Alternatively, a distribution  is used.

ρ can be computed from the series expansion:

For rational values of β, ρ(u) can be calculated in terms of elementary functions. But the expression is in general too complex to be useful except for the case  where

Figure 2 shows the same results plotted in both a linear and a log representation.

The moments of the original function can be expressed as

The first logarithmic moment of the distribution of simple-exponential relaxation times is

where Eu is the Euler constant.

Fourier transform 

To describe results from spectroscopy or inelastic scattering, the sine or cosine Fourier transform of the stretched exponential is needed. It must be calculated either by numeric integration, or from a series expansion. The series here as well as the one for the distribution function are special cases of the Fox–Wright function. For practical purposes, the Fourier transform may be approximated by the Havriliak–Negami function, though nowadays the numeric computation can be done so efficiently that there is no longer any reason not to use the Kohlrausch–Williams–Watts function in the frequency domain.

History and further applications 

As said in the introduction, the stretched exponential was introduced by the German physicist Rudolf Kohlrausch in 1854 to describe the discharge of a capacitor (Leyden jar) that used glass as dielectric medium. The next documented usage is by Friedrich Kohlrausch, son of Rudolf, to describe torsional relaxation. A. Werner used it in 1907 to describe complex luminescence decays; Theodor Förster in 1949 as the fluorescence decay law of electronic energy donors.

Outside condensed matter physics, the stretched exponential has been used to describe the removal rates of small, stray bodies in the solar system, the diffusion-weighted MRI signal in the brain, and the production from unconventional gas wells.

In probability, 

If the integrated distribution is a stretched exponential, the normalized probability density function is given by

Note that confusingly some authors have been known to use the name "stretched exponential" to refer to the Weibull distribution.

Modified functions 

A modified stretched exponential function

with a slowly t-dependent exponent β has been used for biological survival curves.

Wireless Communications 
In wireless communications, a scaled version of the stretched exponential function has been shown to appear in the Laplace Transform for the interference power  when the transmitters' locations are modeled as a 2D Poisson Point Process with no exclusion region around the receiver.

The Laplace Transform can be written for arbitrary fading distribution as follows:

Internet Streaming
The stretched exponential has been used to characterize Internet media accessing patterns, such as YouTube and other stable streaming media sites. The commonly agreed power-law accessing patterns of Web workloads mainly reflect text-based content Web workloads, such as daily updated news sites.

References

External links
 J. Wuttke: libkww C library to compute the Fourier transform of the stretched exponential function

Exponentials